John Hales may refer to:
John Hales (theologian) (1584–1656), English theologian
John Hales (bishop of Exeter) from 1455 to 1456
John Hales (bishop of Coventry and Lichfield) (died 1490) from 1459 to 1490
John Hales (died 1540), MP for Canterbury
John Hales (died 1572) (c. 1516–1572), English writer and politician
John Hales (died 1608), at whose house some of the Marprelate tracts were printed
John Hales (died 1639) (1603–1639), English courtier and politician
John Hales (MP for New Shoreham) (1648–1723), English politician
John Hales (trade unionist) (1839–fl. 1882), English trade unionist and radical activist
John Wesley Hales (1836–1914), British scholar
John Hales (archdeacon of Newark) (1870–1952), British Anglican priest
John Hales (cricketer) (1833–1915), English cricketer and civil servant
John Playford Hales (1893–1918), World War I flying ace

See also
John Hale (disambiguation)